Sir Joseph Benjamin Robinson, 1st Baronet (3 August 1840 – 30 October 1929) was a South African gold and diamond mining magnate and Randlord.

Mayor of Kimberley, Northern Cape in 1880, which he represented in the Cape parliament for four years, chairman of the Robinson South African Banking Corporation Co , Ltd and of numeral gold mines in the Transvaal Colony, he was convicted in 1921 of fraud and fined half a million pounds. He is best remembered as having paid political fixer Maundy Gregory £30,000, towards Prime Minister Lloyd George’s political fund, in exchange for a peerage. After the King personally complained and under public pressure, the government forced Robinson to reject the appointment. What became known as the Honours Scandal was one of the reason for the passing of the British Honours (Prevention of Abuses) Act 1925.

Life 
Joseph Benjamin Robinson was born in Cradock, Eastern Cape, the youngest son of Robert John Robinson and Martha.

Robinson fought on the side of the Orange Free State in the Basuto War, and later became a general trader, wool-buyer and stock-breeder at Dordrecht. On the discovery of diamonds in South Africa in 1867 he hastened to the Vaal River district, where, by purchasing the stones from the natives and afterwards by buying diamond-bearing land, notably at Kimberley, he soon acquired a considerable fortune.

His rather forceful business tactics came in for a lot of criticism, earning him the title of "Old Buccaneer" around Kimberly, South Africa but even so he became a member of the Mining Board and later chairman. He raised and commanded the Kimberley Light Horse. He was Mayor of Kimberley in 1880, and for four years was a representative of Griqualand West in the Cape parliament. 
On the discovery of gold in the Witwatersrand district in 1886, Alfred Beit financed a partnership with £25 000. Robinson purchased the Langlaagte and Randfontein estates, but Beit soon dissolved the partnership because of Robinson's temper and business methods. Robinson chose to keep the western portion of their former joint assets, while Beit took the eastern section. His views as to the westerly trend of the main gold-bearing reef were entirely contrary to the bulk of South African opinion at the time, but events proved him to be correct, and the enormous appreciation in value of his various properties made him one of the richest men in South Africa. He founded the Randfontein Estates Gold Mining Company in 1890, which was the largest individual undertaking on the Reef and one of the largest in the world.

As a Rand capitalist he stood aloof from combinations with other gold-mining interests, and took no part in the Johannesburg reform movement, maintaining friendly relations with President Kruger. He claimed that it was as the result of his representations after the Jameson Raid that Kruger appointed the Industrial Commission of 1897, whose recommendations had they been carried out would have remedied some of the Uitlander grievances.

Before the Boer War of 1889—1902 between the British Empire and the two independent Boer states, Sir Joseph lent Paul Kruger, leader of the Boer resistance, a million dollars ($29.6M in 2021).

On 27 July 1908 under recommendation of General Botha to Sir Henry Campbell-Bannerman, he was granted a baronet, according to Andrew Roberts in relation to the controversial issue of the Chinese slave labour in the Transvaal. Winston Churchill, at the time Under-Secretary of State for the Colonial Office, wrote to Campbell-Bannerman to let him know that Robinson wanted a baronetcy, the only British hereditary honour which is not a peerage.

In 1921 the Supreme Court of South Africa found that, while chairman of the Randfontein Estates Company, Sir Joseph had been buying the freehold of mining properties using his private account, in order to sell it back to the company for a profit, all the while concealing it from the shareholders. The Randfontein Estates sued Robinson and under judgment by the Appellate Division of the Supreme Court of South Africa, Sir Joseph was condemned to pay over £500,000.

Honour scandal 

In the 1920s, political fixer Maundy Gregory, encouraged by Prime Minister David Lloyd George, sold honours to raise money for their political fund. When during the Birthday Honours of 1922, Sir Joseph Robinson, who was known as a war profiteer after being convicted of fraud and fined £500,000 (£25M in 2020) whose appeal had been dismissed as recently as November 1921, was nominated for a Barony, for National and Imperial Services, the British public was scandalised. Lord Buxton received the news with "universal astonishment and mystification". According to Geoffrey Wheatcroft Sir Joseph Robinson's skullduggery was also notorious throughout South Africa, as he had been previously fined for defrauding the shareholders of his mining companies.  When it was revealed that Sir Joseph had paid Gregory £30,000 (£1.7M in 2020) for his peerage, officially towards Lloyd George's political fund, King George V himself objected, criticising the "questionable circumstances" in which the award had been granted.

During the Parliament debate that followed, Lord Curzon came to also question Sir Joseph's baronetcy of 1908, remarking that it had been granted for services rendered while chairman of a bank that was no longer in existence at the time. In June 1922 under public pressure, the government forced Robinson to reject the honour. Chief Whip F.E Guest went in person to find Sir Joseph Robinson at the Savoy Hotel to ask him to withdraw from the Peerage list, even thought his name had already been published.

The scandal surrounding the issue tarnished the Coalition government's image, and was somewhat responsible for the Conservatives detachment of Lloyd George's Liberals from the party, later in 1922. The general scandal of sale of peerages led to the Honours (Prevention of Abuses) Act 1925.

Later life and death
Sir Joseph Robinson died at his home, Hawbhornden, Wynberg, Cape Colony, on 30 October 1929, at the age of 90.

Family 
Joseph Benjamin Robinson was the son of Robert John Robinson (1792–1886) and Martha Rozina Strutt. He had five brothers and nine sisters.

He married Elizabeth Rebecca Ferguson, daughter of James Furguson, on 3 October 1877 in Kimberly, South Africa. She was born 4 November 1859 in Victoria West, and died 30 March 1930 in Muizenberg, South Africa. They had 11 children including Ida, who married the Italian Ambassador to South Africa, Prince Natale Teodato Labia the descendants of whom still reside at Robinson's Cape Town home Hawthorndon House

Sir J.B. Robinson's death in 1929 caused a great scandal in South Africa and Britain upon discovery of his will. His personal fortune of £12 million was given to his heirs except one of his daughters, who was only given a mere £2 thousand. He gave nothing to charity. There was a scathing article in the Cape Times after his death.

Legacy 

A street in Kensington, Johannesburg is named after him. Located on this street is a boarding house of Jeppe High School for Boys, namely Tsessebe.

References

Sources 
 Kidd, Charles, Williamson, David (editors). Debrett's Peerage and Baronetage (1990 edition). New York: St Martin's Press, 1990.
 
 
 
 
 
 
 
 
 
 
 
 
  2nd edition

External links 
 Transcript of the 29 June 1922 debate concerning Sir Joseph Robinson recommendation for the grant of a Peerage 
 

1840 births
1929 deaths
People from Cradock, Eastern Cape
South African people of British descent
South African mining businesspeople
Randlords
Baronets in the Baronetage of the United Kingdom